Melinda Fábián (born June, 25 1987) is a Hungarian mixed martial artist, she was the first Hungarian who compete in the UFC.

Background

Born in 1987, Melinda Fábián first started fighting martial arts at the age of 12, starting to shotokan karate at Vértesszőlős where she reached the brown belt. She then made her way to Stockholm, where, besides karate, he became acquainted with Muay Thai. She returned home in 2006 and started her favorite martial art, which she liked as a kenpo karate the Kurayfat campsite. A year later, she had already won a silver medal at the World Championships in Home Affairs as a blue belt. And in 2013, at the World Championships, also home to the podium, she was the winner of the full contact and knockdown rules, with a black belt at her waist. Melinda loves Kenpo karate so much that she runs her own club, Sakura Doyo.
After finding great success at the campsite, Melinda set out on mixed martial arts, which was less well known in Hungary at the time. In this style, ground combat plays the same role as standing, so wrestling and Brazilian jiu-jitsu are at the forefront, as evidenced in Melinda's victories.

Personal life
Fábián had a date and relationship with her Head Coach Ferenc "Rendes" Peszlen.

Mixed martial career

Early career

The blonde lady first entered the cage at HFC 09 in 2015 as the only Hungarian female warrior in a quad tournament in front of a domestic audience. In the opening match, he had a straight-up victory in the first round, but she got exactly the same technique from her more experienced American opponent in the final. Nevertheless, according to Melinda, her lack of routine was the only drawback with the other fighters. In the next 3 games, she ended with one draw, one win (Ezekiel choke) and one with a split scoring defeat.

The defeat was followed by a two-match winning streak (brace, ankle strain), both knocking in the first round. (Interestingly, although Melinda is basically the strength of the stand-up fight, she has achieved all her victories by forcing and has never been knocked out.) Unfortunately, after two quick wins, a defeat slipped, but that did not stop her from winning. The Hungarian girl was to get the big chance of her life from UFC and finally show herself outside the old continent.

The Ultimate Fighter

She has been invited to The Ultimate Fighter UFC reality show, which has not become a former champion, and often gets a UFC contract at the end of the show. And the stake in the 26th TUF season was nothing but the winner becoming the champion of the newly introduced women's weight (57kg) division. Melinda – who even sold her car to buy a plane ticket overseas – joined Eddie Alvarez in the selection. (Eddie Alvarez is a former lightweight champion of Bellator and the UFC.)

Unfortunately, Melinda had an injury during the show, which put her mark on her training and preparation for the game. In the show, every warrior has a homemade video in which Melinda introduces Budapest, her apartment and talks about her team the Budapest Top Team. Her opponent, Rachael Ostovich, is a Hawaiian-born girl with a warrior background, with a balance of 3–3 (Melinda's 4–3–1). At the start of the match, the Hungarian girl worked well in stand-up combat but was unable to defend Rachael's grounding and gave up her back with an unfortunate move and the American took the opportunity and pulled in the back throttle after some submission attempts and some ground-and-pound and victory.

Ultimate Fighting Championship

Fábián faced DeAnna Bennett on December 1, 2017 at The Ultimate Fighter: A New World Champion#The Ultimate Fighter 26 Finale. The fight ended as a majority draw and Bennett was subsequently released from the promotion.

Her second fight came on June 23, 2018, at UFC Fight Night: Cerrone vs. Edwards against Ji Yeon Kim.  She lost the fight via split decision.
 
On August 11, 2018, it was reported that Fábián was released by UFC.

Post UFC career

Fábián faced Karla Benitez on October 22, 2019, at The Cage Fighting Komarno 7. She won the fight via knockout.

Mixed martial arts record

|Win
|align=center|5–4–2
|Karla Benitez
|KO (head kick)
|Cage Fighting Komarno 7 
|
|align=center|3
|align=center|4:59
|Győr, Hungary
|
|-
|Loss
|align=center|4–4–2
|Ji Yeon Kim
|Decision (split)
|UFC Fight Night: Cowboy vs. Edwards 
|
|align=center|3
|align=center|5:00
|Kallang, Singapore
|
|-
|Draw
|align=center|4–3–2
|DeAnna Bennett
|Draw (Majority)
|The Ultimate Fighter: A New World Champion Finale 
|
|align=center|3
|align=center|5:00
|Las Vegas, Nevada, United States
|
|-
|Loss
|align=center|4–3–1
|Judith Ruis
|Submission (guillotine choke)
|Aggrelin 16: MIA Cage Fight
|
|align=center|1
|align=center|4:30
|Munich, Germany
|
|-
|Win
|align=center|4–2–1
|Monic Bilicsi
|Submission (straight ankle lock)
|Aggrelin 15
|
|align=center|1
|align=center|0:14
|Nurnberg, Germany
|
|-
|Win
|align=center|3–2–1 
|Tímea Nyistor
|Submission (armbar)
|Cage Fighting Komárno 1
|
|align=center|1
|align=center|0:38
|Komárno, Slovakia
|
|-
|Loss
|align=center|2–2–1 
|Lucie Pudilová
| Decision (split)
|GCF 34: Back in The Fight 5
|
|align=center| 5
|align=center| 5:00
|Příbram, Czech Republic
|
|-
| Win
| align=center| 2–1–1
| Paulina Borkowska 
| Submission (rear naked choke)
| PLMMA 62: AFC 6
| 
| align=center| 2
| align=center| 2:32
| Wyszków, Poland
| 
|-
| Draw
| align=center| 1–1–1
| Eava Siikonen
| Draw (majority)
| Carelia Fight 11
| 
| align=center| 3
| align=center| 5:00
| Imatra, Finland
|
|-
| Loss
| align=center| 1–1
| Katlyn Chookagian
| Submission (armbar)
| PMMAL Hungarian Fight Championship 9
| 
| align=center| 1
| align=center| 4:33
| Budapest, Hungary
| 
|-
| Win
| align=center| 1–0
| Barbora Poláková
| Submission (armbar)
| PMMAL Hungarian Fight Championship 9
| 
| align=center| 1
| align=center| 3:34
| Budapest, Hungary
|

|-
| Loss
| align=center | 0–1
| Rachael Ostovich
| Submission (rear naked choke)
|rowspan=2| The Ultimate Fighter: A New World Champion
|  (air date)
| align=Center | 1
| align=center | 4:22
|rowspan=2| Las Vegas, Nevada, United States
|

References

Hungarian female mixed martial artists
1987 births
Living people
Hungarian female karateka
Hungarian practitioners of Brazilian jiu-jitsu
Female Brazilian jiu-jitsu practitioners
People from Tatabánya
Mixed martial artists utilizing American Kenpo
Mixed martial artists utilizing Shotokan
Mixed martial artists utilizing boxing
Mixed martial artists utilizing Brazilian jiu-jitsu
Ultimate Fighting Championship female fighters
Sportspeople from Komárom-Esztergom County